The Ligue Nationale de Handball is a governing body established in 2004 to administer French men's professional handball autonomously from the national federation (FFHB). It has jurisdiction over the country's top two men's divisions, a cup tournament and a super cup.

Competitions
LNH Division 1, marketed as Starligue
LNH Division 2, marketed as Proligue
Coupe de la Ligue
Trophée des Champions

President
From June 2010 to February 2018, its president was former rugby union international player Philippe Bernat-Salles. Olivier Girault was the president from 2018 till 2020. David Tebib was an interim in 2021. Bruno Martini is the current president.

References

External links 
Official site

  
Professional sports leagues in France